Jake Monaco is an American film and TV composer. He currently scores Amazon Prime Video’s The Stinky & Dirty Show, Netflix’s Dinotrux, and Warner Bros. Animation’s Be Cool, Scooby-Doo!.

Career 
Monaco began playing guitar in high school, later touring with a group while attending the University of Richmond in Virginia.  A few years after graduating, his bandmates opted to take up non-musical professional careers.

At the suggestion of a friend, Monaco enrolled in a film scoring course at University of Southern California. He has stated that although he had never had interest in scoring as a child, it was these classes that piqued his interest, explaining that he was “sucked in” to the world of scoring almost immediately.

Monaco began assisting for composer Christophe Beck after graduating from the USC program, and through this connection he has contributed music to The Hangover film series, The Muppets, and Get Hard. Monaco credits the time he spent assisting Beck as key to his success as a scorer, and has described assistant positions as “some of the best education and experience a young composer can receive”. After assisting Christophe Beck for eight years, Monaco made the decision to begin scoring on his own.

Monaco credits some of his inspiration as a composer to a stable of unorthodox stringed instruments he acquired from Rich Briggs.  Monaco's studio includes custom-built guitars including a hub cap guitar, a copper pot guitar and a wine box bass.

Recently, Monaco provided the score for 20th Century Fox's Keeping Up With The Joneses.

Discography

Feature films

Short films

References

External Links 
 
 Interview with Jake Monaco, A Podcast Named Scooby-Doo!, October 2017

Year of birth missing (living people)
American film score composers
American male film score composers
American multi-instrumentalists
American music arrangers
American television composers
Living people
Male television composers
Place of birth missing (living people)